Patricia Ann Ferguson (12 February 1936, Dundee – 24 March 2022, Auchterarder) was a Scottish civil engineer. She was chairwoman of Fife Health Board.

She studied at the High School of Dundee and St Margaret's School for Girls, and as a mature student, the University of St Andrews and the Royal Military College of Science, having been approved by Denis Healey. She was a chief civil engineer constructing oil platforms.

She was a competitive showjumper.

References 

1936 births
2022 deaths
Scottish civil engineers
Engineers from Dundee
Scottish women engineers
People educated at the High School of Dundee
Alumni of the University of St Andrews